Script for a Jester's Tear is the debut studio album by British neo-progressive rock band Marillion, released in the United Kingdom on 14 March 1983 by EMI Records. The album reached number seven and spent 31 weeks in the UK Albums Chart, eventually achieving a platinum certificate, and produced the Top 40 single "He Knows You Know" and the Top 20 single "Garden Party".

Script for a Jester's Tear is the only studio album by Marillion to feature the band's original drummer and founding member Mick Pointer, who was dismissed following the album's UK tour. In Martin Popoff's 2016 biography of Yes, the album is credited with being part of a "new wave" of British progressive rock which also helped to give a second life to earlier bands.

Production
Marillion released their first single, "Market Square Heroes", on 25 October 1982. It was a minor hit, peaking at number 53 on the UK Singles Chart. It was produced by David Hitchcock, who was also contracted to work on the group's first full-length album. However, he was seriously injured in a car accident when he drove home after completing work on the single. EMI took advantage of the opportunity and persuaded the group to replace him with Nick Tauber, a producer known for his work with new wave band Toyah and regarded by the record label as more modern.

Neither "Market Square Heroes", nor the B-sides of the 12" single, "Three Boats Down from the Candy" and the 17-minute-long epic "Grendel", were included on Script for a Jester's Tear, although a short radio segment of the A-side can be briefly heard prior to "Forgotten Sons". As stated in the original liner notes, the music from the album was composed, arranged and performed by Marillion and the lyrics were written by Fish alone. However, in the 1997 remastered edition, four out of six songs are additionally credited to bass player Diz Minnit and keyboard player Brian Jelliman, who were both the initial members of the group. The recording sessions for the album started in December 1982 at The Marquee Studios in London and finished in February 1983, with Tauber producing and Simon Hanhart engineering.

The cover artwork was designed by Mark Wilkinson, who would be commissioned to the role on all Marillion releases through The Thieving Magpie (1988).

Release
Script for a Jester's Tear was released in the United Kingdom on 13 March 1983 by EMI on vinyl housed in a gatefold sleeve. In the United States, it was available through Capitol Records.

Critical reception
Dave Dickson in his review for Kerrang! said that "as a debut album this [Script for a Jester's Tear] is extremely impressive, fully living up to the band's previous promise". John Franck has given the album a retrospective rating of four-and-a-half stars out of five on AllMusic. He has called it "a vital piece for any Marillion head and an essential work for any self-respecting first- or second-generation prog rock fan".

Commercial performance
Script for a Jester's Tear was a commercial success, reaching number 7 in the United Kingdom and spending 31 weeks on the charts, the second-longest album chart residency for Marillion. It was awarded a platinum certification by British Phonographic Industry on 5 December 1997 for over 300,000 copies sold. In the United States, however, it failed to make any impact, peaking at number 175 on the Billboard 200 chart.

The album generated two hit singles in the United Kingdom. The first single, "He Knows You Know", preceded the release of Script for a Jester's Tear and launched the group into the Top 40, reaching number 35. The second single, "Garden Party", was released on 6 June 1983 and became even more popular, peaking at number 16. "He Knows You Know" gained some airplay in the United States and reached number 21 on the Billboard Mainstream Rock chart.

Reissues
Script for a Jester's Tear was first released on CD in 1985. As part of a series of Marillion eight studio albums made on a contract with EMI, the album was 24-bit digitally remastered between April and July 1997 and expanded with a second disc containing bonus tracks, including all tracks from the debut single. This edition was issued on 29 September 1997 and has been in print to date. The remastered version was also issued without the second disc in 2000 and contained a pared-down booklet. A new 180g heavy weight vinyl edition featuring a gatefold sleeve and the original artwork was released in 2012.

In 2020, EMI released a deluxe version of the album with four CDs and a Blu-ray disc that contains new remixes of the original album, the full "Market Square Heroes" 12" single (except for the original version of "Market Square Heroes" which is replaced by the "Battle Priest" version), and a previously unreleased live set from 1982 at London's Marquee Club. In addition to that, the Blu-ray also includes the previously released Recital of the Script video and, as extras, promo films of some tracks from the album. It was the penultimate release of Fish era Marillion albums in a recent deluxe reissue campaign that also includes Misplaced Childhood, Clutching at Straws, Brave, and Afraid of Sunlight. Fugazi is the last album put out in this format so far, having been released on September 1st 2021.

Track listing
All writing credits are adapted from the 1997 remastered edition. According to the liner notes of the original version, the whole group is listed as writers, arrangers, and performers; all lyrics are credited to Fish.

Personnel

Marillion
 Fish – vocals
 Steve Rothery – guitars; photography (1997 remastered edition)
 Pete Trewavas – bass
 Mark Kelly – keyboards; digital remastering (at Abbey Road Studios, London, April – July 1997)
 Mick Pointer – drums, percussion

Additional musicians
 Marquee Club's Parents Association Children's Choir – choir (on "Forgotten Sons")
 Peter Cockburn – newscaster's voice (on "Forgotten Sons")

Technical personnel
 Nick Tauber – producer
 Simon Hanhart – engineer, mixing engineer
 Pete James – sound effects
 Jo Mirowski – art direction, design (at Torchlight, London)
 Mark Wilkinson – illustration
 Dave Hitchcock – producer (on "Market Square Heroes" (Battle Priest version), "Three Boats Down from the Candy")
 Craig Thompson – engineer (on "Market Square Heroes" (Battle Priest version), "Three Boats Down from the Candy")
 Danny Dawson – engineer (on "Chelsea Monday" (Manchester Square demo), "He Knows You Know" (Manchester Square demo))
 Pete Mew – digital remastering (at Abbey Road Studios, London, April – July 1997)
 Bill Smith Studio – repackaging design (1997 remastered edition)

Charts

Certifications

References

Marillion albums
1983 debut albums
Neo-progressive rock albums
EMI Records albums